For entries on other people named John Wesley, see John Wesley (disambiguation).

John Wesley Posey (1801–1884) was a significant figure in the Underground Railroad in Indiana, America.  Posey was one of the organizers of the Anti-Slavery League of Indiana.

A significant source of information on the Underground Railroad in Indiana is William Cockrum's 1915 work, History of the Underground Railroad, as It Was Conducted by the Anti-Slavery League.  According to Cockrum, Posey owned a coal mine that served as a way station for as many as 1000 escaped slaves.  (This is one of the rare instances in which the underground railroad was actually subterranean.)

Posey also helped to organize the activities of the Anti-Slavery League.  According to Cockrum, the League operated a spy network in Kentucky.  Agents of the League masquerading as traveling peddlers would make contact with slaves and help the slaves escape.

Posey was a medical doctor.  He volunteered as a surgeon for the Union army during the American Civil War, and served at the Battle of Shiloh.  He was also politically active, and was elected as a Whig to be Treasurer of Pike County, Indiana, serving from 1844 to 1848.

Posey married Sarah Blackburn in 1838.  He was the father of Francis B. Posey.

External links
https://web.archive.org/web/20060117021813/http://www.freedomcenter.org/index.cfm?fuseaction=home.viewPage&page_id=31259840-D0B7-88DE-94919F3C9B675DD4

1801 births
1884 deaths
American abolitionists
Union Army surgeons
People of Indiana in the American Civil War
Underground Railroad in Indiana
Indiana Whigs
19th-century American politicians
People from Pike County, Indiana